The 2003 Molson Indy Toronto was the tenth round of the 2003 CART World Series season, held on July 13, 2003 on the streets of Exhibition Place in Toronto, Ontario, Canada.

Qualifying results

Race

Caution flags

Notes

 Average Speed 96.189 mph

External links
 Full Weekend Times & Results

Toronto
Molson Indy Toronto
Indy Toronto